Meningie may refer to the following.

Meningie, South Australia, a town and locality
District Council of Meningie, a former local government area in South Australia

See also
Meningie East, South Australia 
Meningie West, South Australia